Argentina held presidential elections on 24 October 1999. Legislative elections were held on four dates, 8 August, 12 September, 26 September and 24 October, though most polls took place on 24 October.

Background
The Convertibility Plan, which had helped bring about stable prices and economic recovery and modernization, had endured the 1995 Mexican peso crisis, the 1997 Asian financial crisis, and other global shocks; but not without strain.  Argentine business confidence struggled following these events and unemployment, already higher as a result of a wave of imports and sharp gains in productivity after 1990, had hovered around 15% since 1995. Economic problems also led to a sudden increase in crime, particularly property crime, and President Carlos Menem's unpopularity had left his Justicialist Party (whose populist Peronist platform he had largely abandoned) weakened.

Himself experienced with the burdens of an economy in crisis, former president and centrist UCR leader Raúl Alfonsín negotiated a big tent alliance with the center-left FrePaSo in 1996. Following the Alliance's success in 1997, the party geared for the 1999 elections by nominating Buenos Aires Mayor Fernando de la Rúa for president and Frepaso leader Carlos Chacho Álvarez as his running mate. De la Rúa and Álvarez were both veteran also-rans. A former Peronist who had broken ranks with his party following Menem's turn to the right in 1989, Álvarez remained the country's most prominent center-left figure following the Frepaso's defeat in 1995. He also provided a counterbalance to de la Rúa, a moderately conservative UCR figure who had himself (in 1973) been the running mate on a defeated UCR ticket.

The Justicialist Party was badly positioned as the economy re-entered recession in late 1998. President Menem had only worsened its image by flirting with seeking an unprecedented third straight term, though this was barred by the Argentine Constitution. Unable to persuade Congress to approve these plans, he pledged to run again in 2003, stating that "if I had been permitted to run, I am sure I would have won." His dismissal of de la Rúa as "boring" moreover was effectively used by the Alliance campaign in their ads, by which de la Rúa's tedium became a desirable alternative to Menem's "party" (a reference to the outgoing administration's numerous corruption scandals).

Broadsides like these only further undermined his party's nominee, Buenos Aires Province Governor Eduardo Duhalde, who as a more traditional Peronist, had been distanced from the President since being elected governor in 1991. Duhalde's own approval suffered, however, as crime rates in the Greater Buenos Aires area (home to 2/3 of his constituents) rose steadily. This weakness was highlighted by the Ramallo massacre, a botched police intervention of a bank robbery on September 17 in which members of the force were implicated. An imposing figure in his party despite his diminutive height, Duhalde could only agree on a marginal figure in the party as his running mate: pop musician and former Tucumán Province Governor Ramón Ortega.

Domingo Cavallo, the economist behind the "Argentine miracle" of the early 1990s, had become unpopular during the 1995 recession.  He was acrimoniously dismissed by the President in 1996 following his public allegations of influential "mafias" in Menem's entourage. His statements gained validity, however, following the 1997 murder of a news magazine photojournalist targeted by a shipping magnate close to Menem. Cavallo founded the Action for the Republic, and thus became a further obstacle to Duhalde, who would now lose a large share of the Menem vote to the unpredictable economist.

The recession, which had begun to ease on the eve of the October 24 election date, remained a central campaign issue. De la Rúa, who had earned plaudits for his fiscal discipline while mayor of Buenos Aires, stressed the need to crack down on graft and corruption. Besides referring to Menem himself, he pointed to the presence of exiled Paraguayan strongman General Lino Oviedo (who had been allowed in as a fugitive by Menem) as a poster child of the prevailing state of the rule of law. Duhalde focused on promises to combat the recession and double-digit unemployment. An anticipated runoff election was ultimately not needed, since the Alliance obtained 48% of the total vote - winning on the first round by 10% over Duhalde. Cavallo received only 10%, and much of the remainder went to left-wing parties (in contrast to 1995, when the far-right gained top minor-party status).

The 1999 legislative elections renewed about half of the Chamber of Deputies (130 seats); there were no elections to the Senate. The Alliance obtained 63 seats, the Justicialist Party 51, and Domingo Cavallo's Action for the Republic 7. This left the Justicialists in the minority in the Lower House for the first time since 1989.

Candidates for President 
Justicialist Party (populist): Governor Eduardo Duhalde of Buenos Aires Province.
Alliance for Work, Justice and Education (social democrat): Chief of Government Fernando De la Rúa of the City of Buenos Aires.
Action for the Republic (conservative liberal): Deputy Domingo Cavallo of the City of Buenos Aires.

Results

President

Chamber of Deputies

Results by province

Governors
Provincial elections were held in every province except Corrientes. Elections for Mayor of the City of Buenos Aires were held the following May. The Justicialist Party increased their majority among governors by one, to 15; outgoing Vice President Carlos Ruckauf was elected Governor of Buenos Aires Province, the nation's largest. The UCR retained 6, mainly in the Alliance (all but 3 Alliance candidates, in turn, were from the UCR). The Justicialists wrested governorships from the UCR (Córdoba), from the MPF in Tierra del Fuego (which endorsed the Justicialists), and from the far-right Republican Force (Tucumán); the UCR, in turn, displaced the Justicialists in Entre Ríos, Mendoza, and San Juan.

See also 
 Politics of Argentina
 List of political parties in Argentina

References

1999
Argentina
1999 in Argentina
Presidency of Fernando de la Rúa
1999